Mahmoud Modir al-Molk Djam (1880 – 10 August 1969) was a prime minister of Iran from 1935 to 1939.

Early life
Djam was born in Tabriz in around 1880.

Career
Djam learned French from a Frenchman in Tabriz and began to work as a translator at the French legation. In 1921, he was appointed foreign minister to the cabinet of Seyyed Zia. He served as finance minister in the cabinet headed by Reza Shah. Then Djam served as governor of Kerman and Khorasan. In September 1933, he was appointed interior minister. From December 1935 to October 1939 he served as prime minister. The Persian Corridor was inaugurated during his premiership. From October 1939 to September 1941 Djam was the minister of court. Next, he served as Iran's ambassador to Egypt. In 1948, he was again appointed minister of court. Next, he was named ambassador to Italy. Until his death he was a senator.

During his public service, Djam was a member of the Committee of the Iron (Committee-e Ahan).

Death
He died in Tehran on 10 August 1969 at the age of 89.

See also
Esmail Merat
Fazlollah Reza

References

The following reference was used for the above writing: 'Alí Rizā Awsatí, Iran in the Past Three Centuries (Irān dar Se Qarn-e Goz̲ashteh - ), Volumes 1 and 2 (Paktāb Publishing - , Tehran, Iran, 2003).  (Vol. 1),  (Vol. 2).

1880 births
1969 deaths
People from Tabriz
Prime Ministers of Iran
Government ministers of Iran
Ambassadors of Iran to Egypt
Ambassadors of Iran to Italy
Nationalists’ Party politicians